GCI Communication Corp (GCI) is a telecommunications corporation operating in Alaska. Through its own facilities and agreements with other providers, GCI provides cable television service, Internet access, wireline (networking) and cellular telephone service. It is a subsidiary of Colorado-based company Liberty Broadband, a company affiliated with Liberty Media that also owns a 26% interest in Charter Communications, having been originally acquired by Liberty in 2015.

History
GCI was founded in 1979 by Ron Duncan and Bob Walp. On November 10, 2005, the company reported third-quarter
profits of $2.3 million, down from $9.3 million during
the same three months of 2004.

Products

Television
Based in Anchorage, GCI provides cable television service to approximately three-quarters of Alaska residents. GCI has upgraded most of its network to support digital cable broadcasts and provides high-definition broadcasts in some of the state's larger cities. GCI leases an array of analog and digital cable boxes, including HD and DVR digital cable boxes, to its customers. In 2008, GCI discontinued analog cable service to Anchorage residences, moving to a fully digital platform. 

GCI launched Yukon TV, a OTT streaming service, in November 2020, which requires a customer to subscribe to GCI's internet service. In December 2021, GCI announced that it would discontinue cable TV service in the majority of its markets, including all urban markets, in favor of Yukon TV. It would continue to provide cable service in some rural Alaskan communities, including Bethel and Dillingham, which are not connected to GCI's fiber network.

GCI also provides content to the state-operated Alaska Rural Communications Service satellite system, which in turn provides free over-the-air broadcasts of commercial and public television programs to 235 rural Alaskan communities.

On November 9, 2012, GCI announced plans to purchase KTVA, a CBS-affiliated television station in Anchorage, along with KATH-LD and KSCT-LP, the NBC-affiliated stations in Southeast Alaska. On December 9, 2013, GCI filed to acquire the CBS affiliates in Southeast Alaska—KXLJ-LD in Juneau, KTNL-TV in Sitka, and KUBD in Ketchikan. On July 31, 2020, GCI announced its intent to exit the television business and sold the non-license assets of KTVA to Gray Television.

Internet
GCI provides access to the Internet via multiple means. As of January 2015, GCI provides cable modem services in major cities in Alaska with download speeds up to 250 megabits per second or Mbps(re:D Plan). In mid 2015 GCI will be deploying its fiber re:D network in the Anchorage area first, with download speeds up to 1 gigabit per second(1,000Mbit/s). To start that campaign, GCI has increased its highest home internet plan (re:D) from 50MMbps to 100Mbit/s and then to 250Mbit/s for free in all available areas that has access to the re:D plan. The re:D plan is currently to this date $174.99 and when the re:D 1Gbit/s Fiber network launches, the price will remain the same. In the rural cities of Nome, Cordova, Bethel, and Utqiaġvik, GCI provides high-speed cable modem services but uses a satellite for the backhaul connection, as the cost to lay cable to these remote areas is prohibitively expensive. In some rural communities where GCI does not have a cable TV infrastructure, it provides lower-bandwidth (56-512 kbit/s) wireless Internet access over a satellite backhaul.

Through its own facilities and agreements with other providers, primarily Alaska Communications Systems, GCI provides data network and Internet connections via GPON DSL, PRI leased lines (such as a T1), and other high-bandwidth business-class products. These services are aimed at the business market. The state government is a major customer of GCI, using GCI's infrastructure to provide the backbone for the state's wide area network.

GCI maintains local access numbers throughout the state for analog dial-up service. GCI however no longer offers dial up service to customer accounts, but will continue to support customers who are grandfathered into the service.

GCI also owns Alaska United fiber optic cable system, which connects Anchorage and Fairbanks with Internet points of presence in Seattle and Portland. GCI leases capacity on their system to other Internet providers in Alaska, including Clearwire wireless broadband.

Wireline telephone
GCI offers local telephone service in many Alaskan markets as well as intrastate and interstate long-distance. As the competitive local exchange carrier, GCI primarily contracts with the incumbent local exchange carrier, Alaska Communications Systems, to provide the local loop from GCI's switches to customers. (This practice is known as UNE-loop.)

GCI is currently deploying digital cable telephony based on PacketCable technology in Utqiaġvik as a replacement for the analog copper. In GCI's implementation, the connection between the GCI head end and the subscriber's EMTA uses IP packets but is interconnected with GCI's more traditional circuit-switched infrastructure and backbone.

GCI also provides legacy as well as Cisco VoIP telephony for many customers, including the state government.

Wireless telephone
Through an agreement with Dobson Communications Systems, which provided TDMA and GSM cellular service under the Cellular One brand, GCI formerly sold GSM cellular service under its own name while providing Dobson with the back-end network infrastructure. AT&T's purchase of Dobson, however, resulted in an agreement on December 3, 2007, that released Dobson, now under the AT&T Wireless brand, from its contract to use GCI for its back-end network on July 1, 2008; AT&T Wireless now uses existing AT&T Alascom networks. GCI will continue to contract with AT&T Wireless for the use and resale of its products and services through June 30, 2012, but will also invest $100 million in its own network. It also plans to spend approximately $10 million to complete its acquisition of the remaining 20% of Alaska DigiTel, a competing CDMA-based cellular carrier. On December 4, 2014, GCI agreed to purchase the wireless assets of Alaska Communications for $300 million. The deal is expected to close in the first quarter of 2015.

Radio frequency spectrum chart

The following chart describes radio frequency spectrum bands accessible by the company's customers.

See also
List of United States telephone companies
 Other cable based services
 2010 Alaska Turbo Otter crash

References

External links
 
 GCI SchoolAccess
 GCI ConnectMD

1979 establishments in Alaska
Cable television companies of the United States
Communications in Alaska
Companies based in Anchorage, Alaska
Companies listed on the Nasdaq
Technology companies established in 1979
Telecommunications companies of the United States